Belmont Street is the debut extended play by Jess & Matt. The 6 track EP includes 5 iconic Australian covers and one original song "Sydney to Me" which they performed for the first time on the steps of the Sydney Opera House at the 2017 Australia Day Concert.

Reception
David from AuspOp gave the EP 3 out of 5 saying; "Original track "Sydney to Me" is a nice ode to a city they love" but said from there "...this is where things go downhill".

Track listing

Charts

Release history

References

2017 debut EPs
EPs by Australian artists
Sony Music Australia albums